Islam is the predominant religion in Uzbekistan. It totals 94% of the population.

Religiosity and confessions 

According to WIN-Gallup International's 2012 Global Index of religiosity and atheism, 79% of the respondents from Uzbekistan who took part in the survey considered themselves a religious person, another 16% stated they were not religious, 2% convinced atheists, and 3% had checked no response box.

As of 1 June 2019 there were 2,286 registered religious organisations from 16 different confessions:

In total, 2098 mosques and islamic organizations, 160 churches and 28 other religious organizations

Soviet era 
State atheism was an official policy in the Soviet Union and other Marxist–Leninist states. The Soviet Union used the term gosateizm, a syllabic abbreviation of "state" (gosudarstvo) and "atheism" (ateizm), to refer to a policy of expropriation of religious property, publication of information against religion and the official promotion of anti-religious materials in the education system. By the late 1980s, the Soviets had succeeded in curtailing religion in Uzbekistan by removing its outward manifestations: closing mosques and madrasas; banning religious text and literature; outlawing non-state-sanctioned religious leaders and congregations.

Since independence 
Uzbekistan is a secular country and Article 61 of its constitution states that religious organizations and associations shall be separated from the state and equal before law. The state shall not interfere in the activity of religious associations.

In the early 1990s with the end of Soviet power large groups of Islamic missionaries, mostly from Saudi Arabia and Turkey, came to Uzbekistan to propagate Sufi and Wahhabi interpretations of Islam. In 1992, in the town of Namangan, a group of radical Islamists educated at Islamic universities in Saudi Arabia took control of a government building and demanded that president Karimov declare an Islamic state in Uzbekistan and introduce shari‛a as the only legal system.

The regime, however, prevailed, and eventually struck down hard on the Islamic militant groups, leaders of which later fled to Afghanistan and Pakistan and were later killed in fights against coalition forces. In 1992 and 1993 around 50 missionaries from Saudi Arabia were expelled from the country. The Sufi missionaries too were forced to end their activities in the country.

Islam 

There are more Sunni than Shia Muslims among the residents. Islam was brought to the ancestors of modern Uzbeks during the eighth century when the Arabs entered Central Asia. Islam initially took hold in the southern portions of Turkestan and thereafter gradually spread northward. Islamic customs were broadly adopted by the ruling elite, and they began patronage of scholars and conquerors such as Muhammad al-Bukhari, Al-Tirmidhi, al-Biruni, Avicenna, Tamerlane, Ulugh Begh, and Babur. In the 14th-century, Tamerlane constructed many religious structures, including the Bibi-Khanym Mosque. He also constructed one of his finest buildings at the tomb of Ahmed Yesevi, an influential Turkic Sufi saint who spread Sufism among the nomads. Islam also spread amongst the Uzbeks with the conversion of Uzbeg Khan. He was converted to Islam by the influence of Ibn Abdul Hamid, a Bukharan sayyid and sheikh of the Yasavi order. Uzbeg promoted Islam amongst the Golden Horde and fostered Muslim missionary work to expand across Central Asia. In the long run, Islam enabled the khan to eliminate interfactional struggles in the Horde and to stabilize state institutions.

During the Soviet era, Moscow greatly distorted the understanding of Islam among Uzbekistan's population and created competing Islamic ideologies among the Central Asians themselves. The government sponsored official anti-religious campaigns and severe crackdowns on any hint of an Islamic movement or network outside of the control of the state.  Moreover, many Muslims were subjected to intense Russification. In Uzbekistan the end of Soviet power did not bring an upsurge of Islamic fundamentalism, as many had predicted, but rather a religious revival among the population. Currently, according to a Pew Research Center report, Uzbekistan's population is 96.3% Muslim.

Christianity 
 
Prior to the advent of Islam, present-day Uzbekistan had communities of Eastern Christians, including Assyrians (historically associated with Nestorianism) and Jacobites (historically associated with miaphysitism). Between the 7th and the 14th centuries Nestorian communities were established, through an extraordinary missionary effort, in the territory of present-day Uzbekistan. Major Christian centres emerged in Bukhara and Samarkand. Amongst artifacts that have been discovered in Central Asia, many coins with crosses on them have been recovered from around Bukhara, mostly dating from the late seventh or early eighth centuries. In fact, more coins with Christian symbols have been found near Bukhara than anywhere else in Central Asia, prompting the suggestion that Christianity was the religion of the ruling dynasty or even state religion in the principality where this coinage was issued. Several dates for the appointment of the first bishop in Samarkand are given, including the patriarchates of Ahai (410–415), Shila (505–523), Yeshuyab II (628–643) and Saliba-Zakha (712–728). During this time prior to the Arab invasion, Christianity had become, next to Zoroastrianism, the second most powerful religious force in the territory. Marco Polo, who arrived in Khanbaliq in 1275, met Nestorians in many different places on his journeys, including Central Asia. Polo describes the building of a great church dedicated to John the Baptist in Samarkand that was erected to celebrate the conversion of the Chaghatayid khan to Christianity. After Arab invasion, Nestorians were required to pay a poll tax levied in exchange for the privilege of maintaining their religion, were prohibited from building new churches and displaying the cross in public. As a result of these and other restrictions, some Christians converted to Islam. Others factors were such as the plague that swept through at least the Yeti Su area around 1338–1339, that probably wiped out much of the Christian community there, and the economic advantages of conversion to Islam for those involved in trade, since the Silk Road trade by this time was almost entirely in the hands of Muslims. Furthermore, Ruy Gonzalez de Clavijo, the Spanish ambassador to Timur's court, mentions Nestorian Christians, Jacobite Christians, Armenian Christians and Greek Christians in Samarkand in 1404. However, subsequent persecution during the rule of Timur's grandson Ulugh Beg (1409–1449) resulted in this remnant being completely wiped out.

After the Russian invasion of 1867, Christian Orthodoxy arrived in the region, with churches built in large cities, to serve Russian and European settlers and officers. 
Today most of the Christians in Uzbekistan are ethnic Russians who practice Eastern Orthodox Christianity.

There are also communities of Roman Catholics, mostly ethnic Poles. The Catholic Church in Uzbekistan is under the spiritual leadership of the Pope in Rome. Various religious orders such as the Franciscans and Mother Teresa's Missionaries of Charity have a presence in the country and assist in activities such as caring for the poor, prisoners, and the sick.

Protestants are less than one percent of the population. The Evangelical Lutheran Church in Uzbekistan has seven parishes. The seat of the bishop is in Tashkent. 
A 2015 study estimates some believers in Christ from a Muslim background in the country, most of them belonging to some sort of evangelical or charismatic Protestant community.

Judaism 

The number of Jews in Uzbekistan is upwardly corrected to 5,000 in 2007, which presents 0.2% of the total population. Only a small minority of Bukharan Jews have remained in Uzbekistan.

Baháʼí Faith 

The Baháʼí Faith in Uzbekistan began in the lifetime of Bahá'u'lláh, the founder of the religion. Circa 1918 there were an estimated 1900 Baháʼís in Tashkent. By the period of the Soviet policy of oppression of religion the communities shrank away – by 1963 in the entire USSR there were about 200 Baháʼís. Little is known of the period but the religion began to grow again in the 1980s. In 1991 a Baháʼí National Spiritual Assembly of the Soviet Union was elected but was quickly split among its former members. In 1994 the National Spiritual Assembly of Uzbekistan was elected. In 2008 eight Baháʼí Local Spiritual Assemblies or smaller groups had registered with the government though more recently there were also raids and expulsions.

Hinduism 
According to ARDA, there were 734 Hindus in Uzbekistan in 2010.
Hare Krishna has one group registered in Uzbekistan.

Buddhism 
 Many Buddhism relics have been found in the territory of present-day Uzbekistan, indicating the wide practice of the religion in antic times. Most of the Buddhist relics are found in the area called Bactria or Tokharestan, actual south-east Uzbekistan near the border with Tajikistan and Afghanistan (Termez, Surkhondaryo province).

Zoroastrianism 
The ancient pre-Islamic religion of Uzbekistan-Zoroastrianism survives today and is followed by 7,000 people in Uzbekistan.

Atheism 
According to WIN-Gallup International's 2012 Global Index of religiosity and atheism 2% of the respondents who took part in the survey were "convinced atheists".

See also 
 Demographics of Uzbekistan

References